Juan de la Cruz Cano y Olmedilla was a Spanish  cartographer. For many years, Cano was the cartographer of the king Carlos III of Spain.

He made maps of Spain and of the Spanish possessions in Latin America. He is especially known for a 1775 map of South America.

References

Spanish cartographers
18th-century cartographers
18th-century Spanish people